En with descender (Ң ң; italics: Ң ң) is a letter of the Cyrillic script. Its form is derived from the Cyrillic letter En (Н н) by adding a descender to the right leg.

Usage
The Cyrillic letter En with descender is used in the alphabets of the following languages:

Computing codes

See also
Ӊ ӊ : Cyrillic letter En with tail
Ӈ ӈ : Cyrillic letter En with hook
Ҥ ҥ : Cyrillic ligature En Ge
Ñ ñ : Latin letter Ñ
Ň ň : Latin letter Ň
Ń ń : Latin letter Ń
Ŋ ŋ : Latin letter Eng
  : Latin letter N with descender
Cyrillic characters in Unicode

Cyrillic letters with diacritics
Letters with descender (diacritic)